Bui may refer to:
Bank Unique Identifier
Bui (Cameroon department), an administrative subdivision
Bùi, a common Vietnamese surname
Bui Dam, Ghana
 Bui National Park, Ghana
An enemy character in the anime/manga YuYu Hakusho
Gianni Bui, Italian footballer

The acronym BUI may refer to:
Baptist Union of Ireland
Boating Under the Influence
Boxing Union of Ireland
Browser user interface
Bokondini Airport, Indonesia (IATA code: BUI)
Biking Under the Influence

See also
Buy (disambiguation)
Buj
Buoy